The Men's 200m butterfly event at the 2010 South American Games was held on March 27, with the heats at 10:26 and the Final at 18:05.

Medalists

Records

Results

Heats

Final

References
Heats
Final

Butterfly 200m M